Yencken is a surname. Notable people with the surname include:

Arthur Ferdinand Yencken (1894–1944), Australian diplomat
Edward Yencken (1854–1932), Australian hardware merchant
David Yencken (1931–2019), Australian builder, businessman, academic, and heritage practitioner